Erich Seidel (1882–1946) was a German ophthalmologist known for his studies in the field of glaucoma, ocular anesthesia and aqueous humor dynamics.  Seidel test and Seidel's scotoma are named after him.

Biography
Erich Seidel was born on 1882 December 30 at Apolda, Thüringen, Germany.

He received MD from Jena in 1907 (Topic: über die Lidbildung mittels übertragener stiellser Hautlappen (eyelid formation by means of transferred skin flaps)). After specialising in Ophthalmology during 1907-1910, he began working as an assistant at the University of Heidelberg Eye Clinic in 1910 and was appointed Head Physician in 1916 and Ausserordentlicher Professor in 1919. In 1935 he was offered to join at the University of Gottingen, but he rejected.

Receiving habitation in Heidelberg in 1914, his inaugural address was on the problems of spectacle glasses and solutions through modern spectacle optics.

He spent his last days in Jene, East Germany. He died on February 26, 1946.

Scientific contributions
Seidel studied the formation of aqueous humor in the ciliary body and the flow of aqueous humor through the Schlemm's canal, and attempted to explain the movement of aqueous humor experimentally. In the year 1914 Seidel invented a darkroom provocative test to detect glaucoma. In the same year he also described a glaucomatous Visual field defect which is now known as Seidel sign or Seidel's scotoma. In this scotoma the blind spot of the eye enlarges vertically into a sickle cell shape.

In 1921 he described a test to assess the presence of aqueous humor leakage from the anterior chamber of the eye, which is known as Seidel test now.

Selected publications

 Seidel E. Beiträge zur Frühdiagnose des Glaukoms. Untersuchungen über das zentrale Gesichtsfeld mit Prüfungsobjekten unter kleinem Gesichtswinkel (Bjerrum). Albrecht von Graefes Archiv für Ophthalmologie. 1914; 88(1): 102-157
 Seidel E. Weitere experimentelle Untersuchungen uber die Quelle und den Verlauf der intraokularen Safstromung: XII. Ueber den manometrischen Nachweis des physiologischen Druckgefalles zwischen Voderkammer und Schlemmschem Kanal. Archiv für Ophthalmologie. 1921;107:101-104.

Awards and honours
Seidel was awarded with von Graefe-Preis in 1925 by the German Ophthalmological Society.

References

German ophthalmologists
People from Apolda
1882 births
1946 deaths